Chiqllaqucha may refer to:
 Chiqllaqucha, Ancash
 Chiqllaqucha, Junín